Bernard Deconinck (26 April 1936 – 15 April 2020) was a French track cyclist who won a silver medal in the motor-paced racing at the 1959 World Championships. His father Henri Deconinck was an elite road cyclist.

Deconinck died in Cavaillon on 15 April 2020 at the age of 83.

References

External links 

1936 births
2020 deaths
French male cyclists
French track cyclists